The 2010–11 Midland Football Alliance season was the 17th in the history of Midland Football Alliance, a football competition in England.

Clubs and League table
The league featured 19 clubs from the previous season, along with four new clubs:
Dunkirk, promoted from the East Midlands Counties League
Ellesmere Rangers, promoted from the West Midlands (Regional) League 
Heath Hayes, promoted from the Midland Football Combination 
Willenhall Town, relegated from the Northern Premier League

League Table

References

External links
 Midland Football Alliance

2010–11
9